Tallinna JK or simply TJK is a defunct Estonian football club, based in Tallinn. Founded in 1921, TJK were one of the founding members of the Estonian Football Championship in 1921. On 4 January 2008 Tallinna JK and SK Legion Tallinn merged into Tallinna JK Legion.

TJK became the Estonian champions twice, winning the Estonian Football Championship in 1926 and 1928. The club also lifted the Estonian Cup in 1939 and unofficially in 1940.

History

Pioneers in Estonian football (1921–1941) 
Tallinna Jalgpalli Klubi was founded on 5 May 1921 by Estonian footballers, who had returned from World War I and Estonian War of Independence and had lost their spot in their former clubs Tallinna Kalev or Sport Tallinn. Coached by Olympic silver medalist in the marathon Jüri Lossmann, the club took part in the first Estonian Football Championship in 1921, where they finished runners-up to Sport Tallinn.

In many ways, TJK was a pioneer in the Estonian football. They became the first Estonian sports club to solely focus on football and have it also mentioned in their name. Following the appointment of Hungarian Franz Woggenhuber as coach in 1922, TJK became the first football club in Estonia to have a foreign coach. In August 1925, the club also opened the first modern football stadium in Estonia. Furthermore, TJK members Johannes Ellip and August Siiber wrote the first statute of the Estonian Football Association.

Tallinna JK won the Estonian Football Championship in the 1926 season, where they beat Kalev 6–0 in the semi-final and in the final defeated the reigning champions Sport 4–1. TJK were crowned champions again in 1928. At the end of the same year, TJK player Arnold Pihlak joined FK Austria Vienna and became the first professional Estonian footballer.

The club also lifted the Estonian Cup in 1939 and won the final in the following year, but the competition was deemed unofficial due to World War II. TJK was disbanded in 1941 after Estonia had been occupied by the Soviets.

Rebirth and merger into TJK Legion (2001–2008) 
Tallinna Jalgpalli Klubi was brought back to existence in 2001 and started playing in Esiliiga. The club quickly became renowned for its successful youth system and was the starting point for famous Estonian internationals Konstantin Vassiljev, Tarmo Kink and Dmitri Kruglov. In 2007, Tallinna JK and SK Legion merged and the club was named Tallinna JK Legion.

Stadium

TJK jalgpalliväli 
After being founded in 1921, TJK actively start to look for a field, where they could construct their own football stadium. Initially, the club eyes a field in the Kalamaja district, but the Tallinn City Government sees an area located next to Narva maantee and near the Kadriorg beach more suitable for football. A year later, the City Government decides to rent out the area to TJK and on 16 August 1925, the first grass surface football stadium is opened in Estonia. 

Named TJK jalgpalliväli, the stadium's wooden grandstand could seat 3,740 people. With additional standing capacity of 6,000, the stadium could facilitate 9,740 spectators.

Wismari staadion 
After the club was re-established in 2001, the field, where once laid the TJK jalgpalliväli, had been replaced by Liivaoja apartment buildings. TJK started to operate in the Wismari Stadium. Opened in 1916, Wismari was once the home ground of TJK's arch-rivals Sport Tallinn.

Achievements
Estonian Championship: (2)

1926, 1928

Estonian Cup: (2)

1939, 1940 (unofficial)

Notable former players
  Eduard Ellman-Eelma – the former Estonia international footballer
  Otto Silber - Estonia international
  Voldemar Peterson - Estonia international
  Dmitri Kruglov – Estonia international
  Konstantin Vassiljev – Estonia international
  Tarmo Kink – Estonia international

References

 
Tallinna Jalgpalliklubi
Association football clubs established in 1921
1921 establishments in Estonia
2002 establishments in Estonia
2008 disestablishments in Estonia